Jan-André Sievers (born 5 August 1987) is a German footballer who plays for TuS Hartenholm.

Career 
Born in Frankfurt am Main, Sievers began his career with MTV Treubund Lünerburg, later signing with Lüneburger SV. He joined the Hamburger SV Youth Program in February 2005. In summer 2006 he was promoted to the amateur team and played his first games in the Regionalliga Nord. After only one year, Sievers joined Lüneburger SK. After six months with Lüneburger SK he signed a contract with VfB Lübeck. After another half year, he transferred to Kickers Emden. After the retraction from Kickers Emden out of the 3. Liga, Sievers transferred to FC Carl Zeiss Jena. After one year he left Carl Zeiss Jena and signed for SV Sandhausen on 14 May 2010. Two years later, he signed for SC Fortuna Köln

Personal life 
Jan-André is the son of Ralf Sievers and nephew of Jörg Sievers.

References

External links

1987 births
Living people
Footballers from Frankfurt
German footballers
Association football defenders
Hamburger SV II players
Lüneburger SK players
VfB Lübeck players
Kickers Emden players
FC Carl Zeiss Jena players
SV Sandhausen players
SC Fortuna Köln players
3. Liga players
Regionalliga players